Marie T. Huhtala (born 1949 Los Angeles) is an American Career Foreign Service Officer who was Ambassador Extraordinary and Plenipotentiary to Malaysia (2001–2004).  She has also served as Consul General at the U.S. Consulate General in Quebec City.

Her son, a lieutenant in the Air Force, was training near Hill Air Force base in Utah in anticipation for participating in Operation Iraqi Freedom when he perished in a “flight-training incident” on October 25, 2002.

Huhtala was sworn in as Ambassador to Malaysia two days after the 9/11 attacks in New York and Malaysia. Malaysia, unlike regional neighbors Singapore, Thailand and the Philippines, did not support the US vis-a-vis Iraq.  She stated “Your country strongly opposed us (on Iraq) and that’s just a fact we’re going to have to live with. But, like I’ve said, our emphasis is on moving toward the future.”. She was interested in improving communications between the two countries surrounding a misunderstanding about a travel ban and improving the process for Malaysian students who need visas to study in the US.

Huhtala received an undergraduate degree in French from Santa Clara University in California, a master's degree in political science from Laval University, Quebec and is a 1988 graduate of the National War College. From 1995 to 1996 she was a member of the Senior Seminar, an interagency executive development program organized by the State Department's National Foreign Affairs Training Center.

References

External links
The Association for Diplomatic Studies and Training Foreign Affairs Oral History Project AMBASSADOR MARIE THERESE HUHTALA

American consuls
Ambassadors of the United States to Malaysia
Santa Clara University alumni
Université Laval alumni
American women ambassadors
National War College alumni
1949 births
Living people
People from Los Angeles
21st-century American women